Margit Hvammen (26 September 1932 – 10 May 2010) was a Norwegian alpine skier.

Career
Hvammen competed at the 1952 Winter Olympics in Oslo, where she placed 7th in the downhill, 18th in giant slalom, and 18th in slalom. She represented the club Geilo IL.

Personal life
Hvammen was born in Geilo. She was a sister of Aud Hvammen, a sister-in-law of Peder Lunde Jr., and aunt of Jeanette Lunde. She died on 10 May 2010.

References

External links

1932 births
2010 deaths
People from Hol
Norwegian female alpine skiers
Olympic alpine skiers of Norway
Alpine skiers at the 1952 Winter Olympics
Sportspeople from Viken (county)